STS-104 was a Space Shuttle mission to the International Space Station (ISS) flown by Space Shuttle Atlantis. Its primary objectives were to install the Quest Joint Airlock and help perform maintenance on the International Space Station. It launched on 12 July 2001 at 09:04 UTC, and returned to Earth without incident after successful docking, equipment installation, and three spacewalks.

Crew

Mission highlights

The primary purpose of the flight was to deliver and install the Quest airlock. The Joint Airlock is a pressurized flight element consisting of two cylindrical chambers attached end-to-end by a connecting bulkhead and hatch. Once installed and activated, the ISS airlock became the primary path for International Space Station space walk entry and departure for U.S. spacesuits, which are known as Extravehicular Mobility Units, or EMUs. In addition, the Joint Airlock is designed to support the Russian Orlan spacesuit for EVA activity.

The Joint Airlock is 20 ft (6.1 m) long, 13 ft (4.0 m) in diameter and weighs 6.5 short tons (5.9 metric tons). It is made from steel and aluminum, and manufactured at the Marshall Space Flight Center (MSFC) by the Space Station main contractor Boeing. The ISS-airlock has two main components: a crew airlock and an equipment airlock for storing EVA gear and EVA preflight preps. STS-104 also carries a spacelab pallet with four High Pressure Gas Assembly containers that were attached to the exterior of the airlock.

Mission Specialists Michael Gernhardt and James Reilly conducted three space walks while Space Shuttle Atlantis was docked to the International Space Station. They spent a total of 16 hours and 30 minutes outside. During the first space walk, Gernhardt and Reilly assisted in the installation of the airlock. During the second and third excursions, they focused on the external outfitting of the Quest airlock with four High Pressure Gas Tanks, handrails and other vital equipment. The third spacewalk was conducted from Quest itself.

STS-104 was the final Space Shuttle mission to have a five-member crew. All succeeding missions would have six or seven (except the final mission STS-135, which had 4).

First flight of Block II SSME 
STS-104 was the first shuttle mission to fly with a "Block II" SSME. Post-launch analysis indicated an anomaly occurred when the engine was shut down. The cause was determined and the mitigation approach was demonstrated on the STS-108 flight in November 2001.

Space walks
 Gernhardt and Reilly  – EVA 1
EVA 1 Start: 15 July 2001 – 03:10 UTC
EVA 1 End: 15 July 2001 – 09:09 UTC
Duration: 5 hours, 59 minutes
 Gernhardt and Reilly  – EVA 2
EVA 2 Start: 18 July 2001 – 03:04 UTC
EVA 2 End: 18 July 2001 – 09:33 UTC
Duration: 6 hours, 29 minutes
 Gernhardt and Reilly  – EVA 3
EVA 3 Start: 21 July 2001 – 04:35 UTC
EVA 3 End: 21 July 2001 – 08:37 UTC
Duration: 4 hours, 02 minutes

Wake-up calls 
NASA began a tradition of playing music to astronauts during the Gemini program, which was first used to wake up a flight crew during Apollo 15.
Each track is specially chosen, often by their families, and usually has a special meaning to an individual member of the crew, or is applicable to their daily activities.

See also

List of human spaceflights
List of International Space Station spacewalks
List of Space Shuttle missions
List of spacewalks and moonwalks 1965–1999
Outline of space science

References

External links
 NASA mission summary 
 STS-104 Video Highlights 

Space Shuttle missions
Spacecraft launched in 2001